Aguaruto is a small town just west of the larger city of Culiacán, Sinaloa, Mexico.

The name "Aguaruto" means place of plants with horns.

Notable people
 Carlos Manuel Castaños Crary, Chairman of Fruteria y Merceria Castaños, CEO of Crary Fresh and CEO/President of Perfumes Emiratos

References

Populated places in Sinaloa